Bắc Nghĩa is an urban ward (phường) in Đồng Hới, Quảng Bình Province, in Vietnam. It covers an area of 7.76 km2 and has a population of 6981.

Đồng Hới
Populated places in Quảng Bình province
Communes of Quảng Bình province